Coney Island Brewing Co. is a Brooklyn-based craft brewery.

Founded in 2007, the brewery was "the world's smallest brewery," operating out of Coney Island USA's Freakatorium, yielding one gallon of beer per batch brewed. The brewery moved to its current location of Maimonides Park in 2015, after it was devastated by Hurricane Sandy.

The brewery was purchased by Boston Beer Co. when the company purchased Shmaltz Brewing Company in 2013. The company ceased production of its hard root beer, hard ginger ale, and hard orange cream ale in 2018, choosing to focus on craft beer. Its flagship line of Mermaid Pilsner, Merman NY IPA, and Beach Beer is available in thirteen states.

References

External link

Companies based in Brooklyn
Beer brewing companies based in New York City
Alcoholic drink companies